Kobus Marais is a South African politician, Member of Parliament with the Democratic Alliance, and the current Shadow Minister of Defence and Military Veterans.

Education and family life
Marais was born on 26 June 1959 as Sarel Jacobus Francois Marais in Worcester, Western Cape, where he lives with his wife and two children. He obtained a Bachelors of Economic and a Master of Business and Administration degree from Stellenbosch University. He also studied at the Cape Wine Academy and completed a Master Mentorship Course with the Department of Agriculture.

Early career
He started his career in corporate banking and went on to work in the wine industry in 1989 in various capacities including a partnership in a wine exports business. He then formed his own consultancy, BEFCOM, which specialised in business and marketing strategy, international trade and Black Economic Empowerment (charters, codes of good practice, Agri-agreements, BEE charters, industry scorecards, etc.).

In 2006, Marais worked for the VinPro BEE Advisory Service, representing about 5,000 wine producers in promoting Black Economic Development at farm level.

Political career
He has been involved in politics in the Western Cape for many years, first serving as councillor and mayor in Rawsonville from 1995 to 2000 and then again as a Democratic Alliance councillor from 2000 to 2006, where he was nominated as the Mayoral Candidate for the 2006 Election. He has also held several other positions in the Western Cape Provincial structures, including Breede Valley Local Management Committee Chairperson, Breede River Valley Constituency Chairperson, Western Region Treasurer, Member of the Western Cape Provincial Executive Committee and Western Cape Provincial Treasurer.
Marais was elected to Parliament in 2006 where he served as the DA’s spokesperson on Finance until 2009. He was also the DA spokesperson on disability until 2009 and is very involved in the community, particularly with disability-related organisations.  Upon his re-election to Parliament in 2009, Kobus was appointed as the Shadow Minister of Trade and Industry.
In September 2010 he was reassigned to be the Shadow Minister of Economic Development and the Deputy Shadow Minister of Finance.

He was the President of Disability Sport South Africa(DISSA) and serves on the Governing Board of South African Sport Confederation and Olympic Committee(SASCOC), was recently elected as Vice-President of African Sport Confederation for Disabled(ASCOD), and also serves on the NEC of South African Sport Association for the Physically Disabled(SASAPD), as well as holding numerous other positions on the boards of disabled sport organisations.

Current political positions
Kobus currently serves as the DA's Shadow Minister of Defence and Military Veterans.

References

Offices held

Living people
Democratic Alliance (South Africa) politicians
Members of the National Assembly of South Africa
People from Worcester, South Africa
1959 births
People from the Western Cape
Politicians from the Western Cape